Ashley Fisher (born 25 September 1975) is a professional tennis player who comes from New South Wales in Australia. Fisher turned professional in 1998. Fisher has never played a major singles match on the ATP Tour, but has won four notable doubles titles on tour. The doubles specialist reached his highest doubles ranking of World Number 19 on 22 June 2009. He has reached the 2006 U.S. Open men's doubles semi-finals. Fisher is currently the head coach of the University of South Florida men's tennis team.

Career
Before turning professional, Fisher played college tennis at Texas Christian University in Fort Worth, Texas, where he was a two time All-American for the Horned Frogs.

Fisher also reached the 2006 U.S. Open men's doubles semifinals alongside Tripp Phillips, where they lost to Jonas Björkman and Max Mirnyi, 6–1, 6–4. Fisher and Nikolay Davydenko were Wimbledon men's doubles quarterfinalists in 2004, where they lost to Jonas Björkman and Todd Woodbridge. He has won a total of 26 doubles titles, with 23 minor league Challengers and Futures events on the International Tennis Federation.

Fisher won his first ATP doubles title in Amersfoort with Devin Bowen, where they defeated Chris Haggard and André Sá 6–0, 6–4. His other two ATP titles were with different partners.

Personal

Fisher was born to mother Pamela and father Gary, and has two older siblings. Fisher started playing tennis at age five.

He currently resides in St. Petersburg, Florida and is coached by Glenn Irwin.

In July 2016, Fisher was promoted to head coach for the Division 1 nationally ranked University of South Florida Bulls Men's Tennis Team replacing Matt Hill.

ATP career finals

Doubles: 11 (4 titles, 7 runners-up)

ATP Challenger and ITF Futures finals

Doubles: 42 (27–15)

Grand Slam performance timelines

Doubles

Mixed doubles

External links
 
 
 
 

Australian expatriate sportspeople in the United States
Australian male tennis players
Sportspeople from St. Petersburg, Florida
TCU Horned Frogs men's tennis players
Tennis people from Florida
Tennis people from New South Wales
1975 births
Living people